Sesto Primo Maggio is a station on Line 1 of the Milan Metro. The station was opened on 28 September 1986 as part of the extension from Sesto Marelli to Sesto 1º Maggio. It is the northeastern terminus of the line.

The station is located in Piazza Primo Maggio in the municipality of Sesto San Giovanni, in the metropolitan territory of Milan. The underground station is located under the Sesto San Giovanni railway station of Ferrovie dello Stato.

The station is underground with three tracks in two separate tunnels.

References

Line 1 (Milan Metro) stations
Railway stations opened in 1986
1986 establishments in Italy
Railway stations in Italy opened in the 20th century